Tanios Harb (born 1925) is a Lebanese former sports shooter. He competed in the skeet event at the 1968 Summer Olympics.

References

External links
 

1925 births
Possibly living people
Lebanese male sport shooters
Olympic shooters of Lebanon
Shooters at the 1968 Summer Olympics
Sportspeople from Beirut